Thomas Butler, Viscount Thurles (before 1596 – 1619) was the son and heir apparent of Walter Butler, 11th Earl of Ormond (1559 – 1633), whom he predeceased. He lived at the Westgate Castle in Thurles, County Tipperary. He was the father of the Irish statesman and Royalist commander James Butler, 1st Duke of Ormonde.

Birth and origins 

Thomas was born in 1594 the eldest son of Walter Butler and his wife Helen Butler. At the time of his birth his father was a nephew of the ruling earl, Black Tom, the 10th earl of Ormond. His father's family, the Butler Dynasty, was Old English and descended from Theobald Walter, who had been appointed chief butler of Ireland by King Henry II in 1177.

Thomas's mother was the eldest daughter of Edmund Butler, 2nd Viscount Mountgarret and his wife Grizel FitzPatrick. His father and mother were cousins. Their common great-grandfather was Piers Butler, 8th Earl of Ormond. His parents had married about 1584.

Thomas was one of eleven siblings, two brothers and nine sisters, who are listed in his father's article, but he was the only surviving son.

Marriage and children 
Probably in 1608, but surely before 1610, Butler married Elizabeth Poyntz against his father's wishes. She was the second daughter of Sir John Pointz (died 1633) of Iron Acton, Gloucestershire, and his second wife Elizabeth Sydenham (died 1595).

 
Thomas and Elizabeth had three sons:
 James (1610–1688), became the 1st Duke of Ormond
 John (died 1636), died unmarried in Naples on his travels
 Richard (1615–1701) of Kilcash

—and four daughters:

 Helena or Ellen or Eleanor (1612–1682), before 1633 married Donough MacCarty, 1st Earl of Clancarty
 Eleanor or Ellen, in 1634 married Sir Andrew Aylmer (1613–1671), baronet, of Donadea in the County of Kildare
 Mary (died 1680), in 1629 married Sir George Hamilton, 1st Baronet, of Donalong
 Elizabeth (died 1675), married first James Purcell, Baron of Loughmoe, by whom she had Nicholas Purcell of Loughmoe (1651–1722); she married secondly John FitzPatrick

Viscount Thurles 
At the death of Black Tom on 22 November 1614, Butler's father succeeded as the 11th earl and he became heir apparent with the courtesy title of Viscount Thurles. While the title was secure, the Ormond lands were claimed by Richard Preston, 1st Earl of Desmond, who had married Elizabeth, Black Tom's only surviving child.

Death and succession 
In 1619 after the beginning of his father's long imprisonment in the Fleet Prison, Thomas was summoned to England to answer charges of treason, specifically, of having garrisoned Kilkenny. However, on 15 December the ship conveying him was wrecked off the coast of the Skerries, Isle of Anglesey and he drowned. Like his father, Thurles was a prominent Catholic and it seems likely that his refusal to conform to the established Anglican religion had angered King James I, and may have been the true motive for his summons.

He predeceased his father who would die in 1634. His eldest son James, the future 1st Duke of Ormond, succeeded him as heir apparent and bearer of the courtesy title Viscount Thurles until he succeeded his grandfather as the 12th Earl of Ormond.

Notes and references

Notes

Citations

Sources 

 
  – (for Ormond)
  – 1613 to 1641
  – N to R (for Ormond)
  – 1611 to 1625
  – Canonteign to Cutts (for Clancarty)
  – Scotland and Ireland
 
 
 
  – Viscounts (for Butler, Viscount Mountgarrett)

Thurles, Thomas Butler, 2nd Viscount of
Thurles, Thomas Butler, 2nd Viscount of
17th-century Irish people
British courtesy viscounts
Butler dynasty
Deaths due to shipwreck at sea
Heirs apparent who never acceded
Thurles, Thomas Butler, 2nd Viscount of